Paravitrea clappi is a species of land snail in the family Zonitidae, the true glass snails. It is known as the Mirey Ridge supercoil. This species is endemic to the United States, where it is known from the Great Smoky Mountains National Park in the Appalachian Mountains.

References

External links

clappi
Molluscs of the United States
Gastropods described in 1898
Taxonomy articles created by Polbot